WZRT (97.1 FM) is a Top 40 (CHR) radio station. Licensed to Rutland, Vermont, the station serves the Lebanon-Rutland-White River Junction area of Vermont and New Hampshire. The station is currently owned by Pamal Broadcasting.

History
The station first signed on in 1974 as WRUT.  It was owned by Vermont Radio, Inc. and was a sister station to AM 1380 WSYB.  The call letters referred to its city of license, Rutland, Vermont.

It took the WZRT call sign in 1989.  Z97 branded itself as "The Official Ski Station" and later on as "The Official Ski and Ride Station." Z97 broadcast live from restaurants and nightclubs throughout Killington. In particular, Z97 began a long relationship with two of Killington's largest and famous nightclubs with nightly and apres-ski live broadcasts throughout ski season.

All Communications eventually sold out to H & D Media, which eventually became Excalibur Media. Z97 expanded its winter advertising base to include Okemo, Bromley, Magic Mountain, Sugarbush, West Mountain, and Stratton Mountain. During the late 1990s, Z97 would broadcast the popular "Stratton Mountain Ski and Ride Show" live every Saturday morning from Stratton Mountain from 7:00-10:00.

From 2003 until the middle of 2007, WZRT was in the process of being acquired by Catamount Radio, but never eventually came to fruition. On July 3, 2003, under the ownership of Clear Channel Communications, the station changed its identity to KISS-FM, following the already popular station name from other markets. In May 2006, Albany, New York-based Pamal Broadcasting acquired KISS-FM in a swap of stations with Clear Channel. 

In 2007, Pamal returned WZRT to Z97.  In early 2008, the station rebranded as Z97.1, adding the syndicated "Bob and Sheri" morning show from WLNK in Charlotte, North Carolina. In 2011, the show was transferred over to WJJR, co-owned by Catamount Radio.  In its place, Elvis Duran and the Morning Show began broadcasting weekday mornings, syndicated from WHTZ in New York City.

References

External links
 Z97.1's official website

ZRT
Contemporary hit radio stations in the United States
Pamal Broadcasting
1974 establishments in Vermont
Radio stations established in 1974